A total solar eclipse took place on June 21 2001 with a magnitude of 1.0495. It was the first solar eclipse of the 21st century. A solar eclipse occurs when the Moon passes between Earth and the Sun, thereby totally or partly obscuring the image of the Sun for a viewer on Earth. A total
solar eclipse occurs when the Moon's apparent diameter is larger than the Sun's, blocking all direct sunlight, turning day into darkness. Totality occurs in a narrow path across Earth's surface, with the partial solar eclipse visible over a surrounding region thousands of kilometres wide. Occurring 2.2 days before perigee (June 23, 2001), the Moon's apparent diameter was larger.
Depending on the zone it, could be seen June 20-22

Visibility 
It was visible from a narrow corridor in the southern Atlantic Ocean and southern Africa, including Angola, Zambia, Zimbabwe, Mozambique, the southern tip of Malawi, and Madagascar. A partial eclipse was seen from the much broader path of the Moon's penumbra, including eastern South America and most of Africa.

Images

Related eclipses

Eclipses of 2001 
 A total lunar eclipse on January 9.
 A total solar eclipse on June 21.
 A partial lunar eclipse on July 5.
 An annular solar eclipse on December 14.
 A penumbral lunar eclipse on December 30.

Tzolkinex 
 Preceded: Solar eclipse of May 10, 1994

 Followed: Solar eclipse of August 1, 2008

Half-Saros 
 Preceded: Lunar eclipse of June 15, 1992

 Followed: Lunar eclipse of June 26, 2010

Tritos 
 Preceded: Solar eclipse of July 22, 1990

 Followed: Solar eclipse of May 20, 2012

Solar Saros 127 
 Preceded: Solar eclipse of June 11, 1983

 Followed: Solar eclipse of July 2, 2019

Inex 
 Preceded: Solar eclipse of July 10, 1972

 Followed: Solar eclipse of June 1, 2030

Solar eclipses 2000–2003

Saros 127

Tritos series

Metonic series

Notes

References
Fred Espenak and Jay Anderson. "Total Solar Eclipse of 2001 June 21". NASA, November 2004.

 Map Google

Photos:
 Spaceweather.com solar eclipse gallery
 Prof. Druckmüller's eclipse photography site. Zambia
 Prof. Druckmüller's eclipse photography site. Angola
 KryssTal - Eclipse in Zimbabwe - in a school by the Ruya River.
 Images from Zimbabwe by Crayford Manor House Astronomical Society
 Eclipse in African Skies, APOD 6/22/2001, totality from Lusaka, Zambia
 Bakasa Eclipse Sequence, APOD 7/6/2001, totality from Bakasa, Zimbabwe
 A Total Eclipse Over Africa, APOD 7/11/2001, totality from Malambanyama, Zambia
 Madagascar Totality, APOD 7/26/2001, from southern Madagascar
 Eclipse Over Acacia, APOD 12/3/2002, from Chisamba, Zambia
 Moon AND Sun, APOD 11/22/2003, totality from Chisamba, Zambia

2001 06 21
2001 in science
2001 06 21
June 2001 events
2001 in Angola
2001 in Zambia
2001 in Zimbabwe
2001 in Malawi
2001 in Mozambique
2001 in Madagascar